Ivan Prenđa (31 December 1939 in Gornji Zemunik – 25 January 2010 in Zagreb) was the Roman Catholic archbishop of the Archdiocese of Zadar, Croatia.

Ordained to the priesthood on 29 June 1964, for the Zadar Archdiocese, Prenđa was appointed Coadjutor Archbishop of the archdiocese on 29 March 1990 and was ordained into that office on 9 June 1990. Archbishop Prenđa became the archbishop of Zadar on 6 February 1996.

Notes

External links

1939 births
2010 deaths
Arbanasi people
20th-century Roman Catholic archbishops in Croatia
Archbishops of Zadar
21st-century Roman Catholic archbishops in Croatia